Sandhya Raga is a 1966 Indian Kannada-language film, directed by  A. C. Narasimha Murthy and co-produced by him along with A. Prabhakara Rao. The film stars Rajkumar, Udaykumar, Narasimharaju and K. S. Ashwath. The film has musical score by G. K. Venkatesh.

The famous song Nambide Ninna Naadadevathe had three versions - one sung by M. Balamurali Krishna, one by Pt. Bhimsen Joshi (climax) and a female version by S.Janaki. Director S. K Bhagawan had revealed that though he had directed this movie, he was not given the official credit. He had also revealed that A. N. Krishna Rao and Beechi had co- written the dialogues with him for this movie. The movie is based on the novel of same name by A. N. Krishna Rao.

Cast

Rajkumar
Udaykumar
Narasimharaju
K. S. Ashwath
H. R. Shastry
Raghavendra Rao
Kuppuraj
Krishna Shastry
Venkatappa
Narasimhan
Radhakrishnan
Master Venkatesh
Ashwath Narayan
Kashinath
Shankar
Bharathi
Pandari Bai
Jr. Revathi
Indrani
Shanthamma
Shanthala
Shailashree

Soundtrack
The music was composed by G. K. Venkatesh. The song 'nambidhe ninna' was sung by three singers. Though S Janaki sang this song alongside singing stalwarts she created her own magic with her inimitable style of rendering. This song became a landmark in her career in Kannada films.

References

External links
 

1966 films
1960s Kannada-language films
Films scored by G. K. Venkatesh
Best Kannada Feature Film National Film Award winners